Elections to the Labour Party's Shadow Cabinet (more formally, its "Parliamentary Committee") occurred in November 1958. In addition to the 12 members elected, the Leader (Hugh Gaitskell), Deputy Leader (Jim Griffiths), Labour Chief Whip (Herbert Bowden), Labour Leader in the House of Lords (A. V. Alexander), and Labour Chief Whip in the House of Lords (Lord Lucan)  were automatically members.

Labour peers held a separate vote for one further member of the cabinet, won by Lord Faringdon.

In the elections, Edith Summerskill regained her place in the cabinet after a year's absence, at the expense of George Brown.  Full results are listed below:

References

1958
Labour Party Shadow Cabinet election
Labour Party Shadow Cabinet election